Masari is a small village in Cyprus, east of Morphou. De facto, it is under the control of Northern Cyprus.

References

Communities in Nicosia District
Populated places in Güzelyurt District